Aleksandr Filanovich (born 1 December 1992) is a Belarusian former professional footballer.

Career
Filanovich spent early career playing for various clubs in the Minsk-based Amateur Football League (ALF), before being recruited by Luch Minsk in 2014.

References

External links 
 
 

1992 births
Living people
Belarusian footballers
Association football forwards
FC Molodechno players
FC Luch Minsk (2012) players
FC Krumkachy Minsk players
FC Torpedo Minsk players
FC Naftan Novopolotsk players